Survivor: Kaôh Rōng — Brains vs. Brawn vs. Beauty is the 32nd season of the American CBS competitive reality television series Survivor. As with Survivor: Cagayan, the season featured players initially divided into three tribes of six based on dominant attribute: "Brains" (intelligence), "Brawn" (athleticism), and "Beauty" (attractiveness and charisma). The season was filmed in Koh Rong, Cambodia during the spring of 2015 and aired from February 17, 2016, until May 18, 2016, when Michele Fitzgerald was named the Sole Survivor over Aubry Bracco and Tai Trang in a vote of 5–2–0.

Though this was the 32nd season to air, it was the 31st to shoot, having been filmed before Survivor: Cambodia, which aired first; the two seasons were filmed back-to-back in the same location. Like all seasons from Survivor: Fiji onward, this season featured hidden immunity idols that could be played after the votes were cast but before they were read; this season also introduced the feature whereby two of these idols could be combined into one single "super idol" that could be played after the votes were read, similar to the idols found in Panama, Cook Islands, and Cagayan. This season also introduced the power to remove a member of the jury, which was given to the finalist who won the final reward challenge. It is known as "the most punishing season of Survivor", due to the multiple medical evacuations. 

Kaôh Rōng opened to positive response from critics and commentators upon initial release, with several praising the season's unpredictability and strong finalists. Ratings remained strong for most of the season and in April, it became the highest rated unscripted program among adults in all demographics.

Contestants
The cast is composed of 18 new players, initially split into three tribes containing six members each: Chan Loh ("Brains"), To Tang ("Brawn") and Gondol ("Beauty"). On Day 17, the 11 remaining players merged into the Dara tribe, named after the Khmer word for "star". The cast includes former NBA player Scot Pollard and Big Brother 16 contestant Caleb Reynolds.

Future appearances
Caleb Reynolds, Debbie Wanner, Aubry Bracco, and Tai Trang returned for Survivor: Game Changers. Bracco returned again for Survivor: Edge of Extinction. Michele Fitzgerald returned to compete on Survivor: Winners at War.

Outside of Survivor, Reynolds competed on the premiere of Candy Crush. Reynolds also competed on a Survivor vs Big Brother episode of Fear Factor. Fitzgerald also competed on the thirty-seventh and the thirty-eighth seasons of The Challenge.

Season summary
The 18 new castaways were divided into three tribes based on primary attribute: Chan Loh (Brains), To Tang (Brawn) and Gondol (Beauty). Though the Brawn lost three of the first four immunity challenges, being reduced to only Cydney, Jason, and Scot, all three survived through the tribe swap, reaching the merge alongside four Brains and four Beauties.

Upon merging, the Brawns and Beauties initially aligned against the Brains but, put off by their male allies’ attitudes, the Brawn-Beauty women (Cydney, Julia and Michele) decided to team up with the Brains instead to form a new majority alliance. Though the minority alliance of Jason, Scot and Tai had two hidden immunity idols, Aubry convinced Tai to betray his allies, getting rid of one of the idols and joining the majority.

Aubry and Cydney were the primary strategists of their alliance, and turned against each other when there were four players remaining; Aubry won the tiebreaker to join Michele and Tai in the finals. The next day, Michele won a challenge against Tai and Aubry in which she had the power to remove a member of the jury from the Final Tribal Council. She chose Neal, due to his support of Aubry's game and his persuasiveness.

At the Final Tribal Council, Tai was largely ignored due to his erratic gameplay, having played his idols and advantages at the wrong time. Aubry and Michele both emphasized how different their games were, with Aubry stating that she made multiple strategic moves to position herself in the game and making fire two nights ago. However, they felt that her social connections were lacking in comparison to Michele. Michele stated that even though she did cruise until the merge, that she still affected the game largely due to her relaxed social game. In the end, Michele beat Aubry and Tai in a vote of 5-2-0.

Episodes

Voting history

Notes

Reception

Critical reception
Overall, the season received a positive response from critics and commentators, who praised its unpredictability and strong players including Fitzgerald, Bracco, Gillon, and Trang. The members of the jury, the lackluster final tribal council, and the final twist that gave one of the finalists the right to vote out a jury member (which resulted in Gottileb's removal), however, were received poorly by many.

Daniel Fienberg of The Hollywood Reporter praised the season's unpredictability but panned the final Tribal Council, saying "this was one of the rare seasons that came into its last leg with no inherently 'wrong' winner;" but was critical of the jury members for providing a very dull final tribal council. He praised Fitzgerald for her alliance management and for winning challenges at crucial points in the game and was of the opinion that the last two challenge wins, which provided "nice [moments] of release and catharsis", were what won her the title in the end. Fienberg, however, criticized the jury, Pollard and Jason in particular, for not voting for Bracco, who he thought had been a stronger strategic player and the undue attention given to Tai during the reunion show; he went on to call the whole two hours "awful".

Andy Dehnart of Reality Blurred echoed Fienberg's sentiment, stating that it "ended up being a strong season overall, with some exceptionally dramatic moments and interesting game play throughout" but the finale was a "disappointing three hours." He was especially critical of jury members Pollard, Jason, and Maiorano, the editing of the final episode, Probst's undue discussion on non-game related things, and lack of attention on players including Bracco and Gillon during the final episode and the reunion show respectively.

Dalton Ross of Entertainment Weekly ranked this season 25th out of 40 praising this season's unpredictability but stated that there "were not enough transcendent players in the cast." In 2020, "Purple Rock Podcast" ranked this season 19th out of 40 saying that the "cast is fairly good, with several memorable players. Despite a few unfortunate setbacks that throw off the gameplay, it’s an enjoyable season." Later that same year, Inside Survivor ranked this season 14th out of 40 calling it underrated and an "incredibly entertaining, character-rich, and, at times, surprising season."

In 2021, Rob Has a Podcast ranked Kaôh Rōng 17th during their Survivor All-Time Top 40 Rankings podcast.

Survivor fans narrowly agreed with the final outcome, voting for Fitzgerald over Bracco by a margin of 3% in a poll conducted by Entertainment Weekly which asked who should've won every season of Survivor.

Trang also received positive attention for his treatment of animals throughout the game, most notably for domesticating a chicken named Mark, after series creator and executive producer Mark Burnett, over the course of the game. Trang's actions prompted musician Sia to make a surprise appearance at the live reunion show to donate $50,000 each to Trang and an animal charity of his choice.

Ratings
Ratings for the premiere were down considerably from both the Worlds Apart season and Cambodia season, attaining a 1.9/7 rating/share among adults 18-49; this was largely due to American Idol airing at the same time as the show and attaining a 2.0/7 rating. Including DVR playback, the premiere was watched by 10 million viewers and got a 2.6 rating in the 18-49 demographic, slightly surpassing American Idol'''s 9.76 million viewers and 2.5 rating.

It was often in the top ten most watched broadcast shows among adults 18–49, a trend that started with episode three. By April, the show became the No. 1 unscripted program among adults in all demographics, beating The Voice''.

Canadian ratings

References

External links
 Official CBS Survivor website

2015 in Cambodia
2016 American television seasons
32
Sihanoukville (city)
Television shows filmed in Cambodia